Pala Dynasty may refer to:

 Pala Empire (750–1174), Indian imperial power ruled by a dynasty centered in present-day Bengal
 Kamboja-Pala Dynasty of Bengal, rulers of parts of the Bengal in the 10th to 11th centuries
 Pala dynasty (Kamarupa) (900–1100), Hindu rulers of Kamarupa kingdom in Assam
 Pal family, landowners of Panchakhanda, Greater Sylhet